The following tables detail e-book reader software for the Android operating system. Each section corresponds to a major area of functionality in an e-book reader software. The comparisons are based on the latest released version.

Software reading systems

File formats supported 

See Comparison of e-book formats for details on the file formats.

Navigation features

Display features

Edit-tool features

Book source management features

Other software e-book readers for Android 
Other e-book readers for Android devices include: BookShout!, Nook e-Reader applications for third party devices and OverDrive Media Console. Additionally, Palmbookreader reads some formats (such as PDB and TXT) on Palm OS and Android devices. The Readmill app, introduced in February 2011, reads numerous formats on Android and iOS devices but shut down July 1, 2014. Another popular app Bluefire Reader was removed from Google Play Store in 2019.

See also 

Comparison of e-readers - includes both device and software formats
Comparison of e-book readers - includes hardware e-book readers
Comparison of iOS e-reader software
Comparison of e-book software

References

External links 

E-reader comparison
Google lists
Multimedia software comparisons